Patrick John Blair Tatten (born January 21, 1981) is an American actor and producer. He is best known for roles in films such as: Dirty Deeds, The Good German, The Soloist , Lucky Bastard, and Boystown on OutTV.

Early life
Tatten was born in Sterling, Massachusetts. He started taking violin lessons at the age of three. He was enrolled in the Thayer Conservatory by his mother. Then Tatten completed St. Mark's School in 2000 and Connecticut College in 2004, with a BA in music theory. In 2005, he moved to Hollywood becoming a resident of Los Angeles.
He works as an actor in both television and film, while also frequently performing as a violinist and musical guest of various acts in Hollywood.

Filmography

References

External links

1981 births
Living people
American male film actors
American male television actors
People from Sterling, Massachusetts
Male actors from Massachusetts